The Flin Flon Bombers are a Canadian junior ice hockey team in Flin Flon, a city located on the Manitoba–Saskatchewan provincial border.  The Bombers are members of the Saskatchewan Junior Hockey League (SJHL), which is a member of the Canadian Junior Hockey League, and play home games at the Whitney Forum on the Manitoba side of the city.

History
The Bombers date back to 1927. Their trademark colours are maroon and white, and their home rinks have been the Flin Flon Community Club Arena (1935–1960) and the Whitney Forum (1960–present).

1939–1948
The Bombers played in the Senior Saskatchewan Hockey League for the 1939–40 to 1944–45 seasons. No information is available for the 1945–46 to 1947–48 seasons.

Saskatchewan Junior Hockey League (1948–1966)
The Flin Flon Bombers were inaugural members of the Saskatchewan Junior Hockey League (1948–1966), which was named the North Saskatchewan Junior Hockey League for the 1948–49 season. 

1956–57 season and 1957 Memorial Cup
The Bombers greatest success during this period came in the 1956–57 season.  During this season, they lost only five games in the regular season, a record for any team during the 18 season existence of the original SJHL, and won the regular season league title by a 19 point margin. In that season's SJHL playoffs, the Bombers beat the Humboldt Indians four games to none in the semi-finals, then won the final over the Prince Albert Mintos four games to two. As SJHL champions, the Bombers then advanced to the Abbott Cup playdowns to determine the champion for Western Canada. They first defeated the Edmonton Oil Kings, a team of junior-aged players competing in the senior-aged Central Alberta Hockey League, by a margin of four games to two, then swept the Thunder Bay Junior A Hockey League's Fort William Canadiens in four games straight to win the Abbott Cup and advance to the Memorial Cup national championship.

As per Junior A rules, the Bombers were permitted to add three players to their roster for the Memorial Cup, picking up goalie Lynn Davis and defenceman Jean Gauthier from the Fort William Canadiens and centre Orland Kurtenbach from Prince Albert Mintos for the Memorial Cup Finals. There, they faced the Eastern Canadian champion Ottawa-Hull Canadiens, coached by Sam Pollock and assistant Scotty Bowman. The first three games were in Flin Flon, with the remaining games played in Regina. The Bombers won the series four games to three, winning the 1957 Memorial Cup, only losing 11 games over their extended 1956–57 season.

The 1956–57 Flin Flon Bombers were inducted into both the Manitoba Sports Hall of Fame and Museum and the Manitoba Hockey Hall of Fame.

Championship roster
Harvey Fleming, Carl Forster, Cliff Lennartz, Barry Beatty, Mike Kardash, Duane Rupp, George Konik, Mel Pearson, Ken Willey, Rod Lee, Wayne Sproxton, Ted Hampson (captain), George Wood, Lynn Davis, Jean Gauthier, Ron Hutchinson, Orland Kurtenbach, Pat Ginnell, Doug Dawson (manager), Bobby Kirk (coach), Hec McCaig (trainer), Jim Wardle (executive), Pinkie Davie (executive), Ken Cunningham (stickboy), Rees Jones (stickboy), Dan McCaig (mascot) were with the team through the SJHL and Abbott Cup championships, and were joined by Lynn Davis, Jean Gauthier and Orland Kurtenbach for the Memorial Cup national championship.

1966–67 season: Manitoba Junior Hockey League
In 1966, Bill Hunter led the formation of the Canadian Major Junior Hockey League (CMJHL, today's Western Hockey League). This led to the demise of the Saskatchewan Junior Hockey League (1948–1966), as five of the eight teams in the SJHL joined the CMJHL, while the Brandon Wheat Kings and Flin Flon Bombers joined the Manitoba Junior Hockey league (MJHL) for the 1966–67 season.

The Bombers, led by Bobby Clarke and Reggie Leach, dominated the MJHL and cruised to a league championship, capturing the Turnbull Memorial Cup. Clarke set league records for most assists (112), goals (71), and points (183). Besides the scoring title, Clarke was also the MJHL rookie of the year, and first team all-star centre. Other Bombers joining Clarke on the first all-star team were right winger Reggie Leach, goaltender Chris Worthy, and defenceman Gerry Hart, who was the Bombers' captain. Bomber defenceman Jack Criel made the second all-star team.

1968–1978: Western Canada Hockey League 

After one season in the MJHL, the Bombers joined the Western Canada Junior Hockey League (WCJHL) for the 1967–68 season.

The Bobby Clarke-led Bombers continued to dominate, finishing in first place for the 1967–68 regular season before losing in the President's Cup playoff finals. The league dropped the "Junior" from its name, becoming the Western Canada Hockey League (WCHL), with the Bombers finishing in first place for the 1968–69 WCHL season, then winning that season's playoffs to become President's Cup champions. As 1969 WCHL champion, the Bombers won a national championship in 1969 by defeating the St. Thomas Barons of the Western Ontario Junior A Hockey League in an unsanctioned best-of-seven series aimed at rivaling the Canadian Amateur Hockey Association–sanctioned Memorial Cup. Clarke led the league in scoring both years, and was named Most Valuable Player in 1969.

The growing financial demands of major junior hockey meant that the Bombers' outgrew their small home arena, and the franchise departed Flin Flon after the 1977–78 WCHL seasonthe last season before the league was renamed the Western Hockey League (WHL). The franchise then played three and a half dismal WHL seasons after leaving Flin Flon with iterations as the Edmonton Oil Kings (Alberta, Canada) for the 1979 season, Great Falls Americans (Montana, USA) in 1980, and the Spokane Flyers (Washington, USA) for the 1981 and part of the 1982 season before folding on December 2, 1981.

1978–1984: NorMan Junior Hockey League
In 1977, the WCHL Bombers had formed a Junior B team as a feeder system. The Jr. B Bombers would win the 1977–78 Baldy Northcott Trophy as Manitoba Provincial Junior B Champions. In the summer of 1978, the Bombers' ownership sold the WCHL franchise to Edmonton while retaining the Junior B Bombers.  The Flin Flon ownership, along with the owners of the Thompson King Miners, banded together with people from The Pas, Manitoba and Snow Lake, Manitoba to create the NorMan Junior Hockey League (NJHL), a rival Jr. B league to the Manitoba Jr. B League.

After one season, the Manitoba Amateur Hockey Association granted the NJHL Tier II Junior A status and the right to compete against the Manitoba Junior Hockey League champions for the Turnbull Cup, whose winner would compete for the Manitoba–Saskatchewan Anavet Cup, that winner competing for the Western Canada Abbott Cup, whose winner would compete for the Centennial Cup Junior A national title.

Flin Flon won NJHL titles in 1979, 1982, and 1984. While no NJHL team ever won the Turnbull Cup, the Bombers had the distinction of being the only NJHL team to ever beat a MJHL team in a playoff game, a feat they accomplished in the 1984 Turnbull Cup.

1984–present: Saskatchewan Junior Hockey League
For the 1984–85 season, the Bombers were granted expansion into the Saskatchewan Junior Hockey League (SJHL)a league which had formed in 1968, following the 1966 demise of the original SJHL.

While Flin Flon straddles the Manitoba/Saskatchewan border with parts of the city within both provinces, SJHL rules at the time required teams to be located in Saskatchewan, prompting the Bombers to identify as the Creighton Bombers. The Creighton Bombers still played in the Flin Flon Whitney Forum arena and were referred to as the Flin Flon Bombers in all non-official context for the 1984–85 and 1985–86 SJHL seasons. In 1986, the SJHL granted the team permission to revert to their Flin Flon Bombers name, officially acknowledging that the franchise was located in Manitoba.

Notable alumni

Murray Anderson
Steve Andrascik
Ron Andruff
Chuck Arnason
Ron Barkwell
Wayne Bianchin
Ken Block
Gene Carr
Bobby Clarke
Kim Clackson
Cam Connor
Jordy Douglas
Gerry Ehman
George Forgie
Jean Gauthier
Tom Gilmore
Patty Ginnell
Ted Hampson
Gerry Hart
Doug Hicks
Glenn Hicks
Garry Howatt
Dan Johnson
Robert Kabel
Mickey Keating
George Konik
Orland Kurtenbach
Reggie Leach
Ken Macdonald
Ray Martyniuk
Jack McIlhargey
Lew Morrison
Mel Pearson
Cliff Pennington
Dennis Polonich
Tracy Pratt
Larry Romanchych
Duane Rupp
Pat Rupp
John Stewart
Blaine Stoughton
Chris Worthy
Ray Neufeld

Season-by-season standings

1 Playoffs cancelled mid-first round due to COVID-19 pandemic
2 Season cancelled due to COVID-19 pandemic

Playoffs
SSHL (Saskatchewan Senior Hockey League), 1939–1944
1939 Lost Semi-Final
Moose Jaw Millers defeated Flin Flon Bombers 3 games to 1 (1 tie)
1940 Did Not Qualify
1941 Lost Semi-Final
Regina Rangers defeated Flin Flon Bombers 3 games to 0
1942 Lost Semi-Final
Saskatoon Quakers defeated Flin Flon Bombers 3 games to 0
1943 Won Semi-Final, Lost Final
Flin Flon Bombers defeated Saskatoon RCAF Flyers 3 games to 0
Regina Army Capitals defeated Flin Flon Bombers 4 games to 2
1944 Won SSHL championship, lost Semi-Final at Western Canada Allan Cup Playoffs
Flin Flon Bombers defeated Moose Jaw Victorias 2 games to 0
Flin Flon Bombers defeated Saskatoon Navy 3 games to 1 WON SSHL CHAMPIONSHIP
New Westminster CPA Lodestars defeated Flin Flon Bombers 3 games to 1 at Western Canada Allan Cup Playoffs
1945 to 1948: No information available
NSJHL (North Saskatchewan Junior Hockey League), 1949–50
1949 Lost Semi-Final
Prince Albert Mintos defeated Flin Flon Bombers 2 games to 1
1950 Lost Semi-Final
Prince Albert Mintos defeated Flin Flon Bombers 3 games to 1
SJHL (Saskatchewan Junior Hockey League), 1951–1966
1951 Won Semi-Final, Lost Final
Flin Flon Bombers defeated Humboldt Indians 3 games to 0 (1 tie)
Prince Albert Mintos defeated Flin Flon Bombers 3 games to 0
1952 Won SJHL Championship, Lost Western Canada Memorial Cup Playoff Semi-Finals
Flin Flon Bombers defeated Saskatoon Wesleys 4 games to 1
Flin Flon Bombers defeated Humboldt Indians 3 games to 2 WON SJHL CHAMPIONSHIP
Regina Pats defeated Flin Flon Bombers 4 games to 0 in the Western Canada Memorial Cup Playoffs
1953 Won SJHL championship, Lost Western Canada Memorial Cup Playoff Semi-Finals
Flin Flon Bombers defeated Prince Albert Mintos 4 games to 2
Flin Flon Bombers defeated Humboldt Indians 4 games to 1 WON SJHL CHAMPIONSHIP
Lethbridge Native Sons (WCJHL) defeated Flin Flon Bombers 4 games to 0 in the Western Canada Memorial Cup Playoffs
1954 Won SJHL championship, Lost Western Canada Memorial Cup Playoff Semi-Finals
Flin Flon Bombers defeated Saskatoon Wesleys 4 games to 3
Flin Flon Bombers defeated Prince Albert Mintos 5 games to 4 (1 tie) WON SJHL CHAMPIONSHIP
Edmonton Oil Kings defeated Flin Flon Bombers 4 games to 0 in the Western Canada Memorial Cup Playoffs
1955 Lost Semi-Final
Prince Albert Mintos defeated Flin Flon Bombers 4 games to 1
1956 Won SJHL Championship, Lost Western Canada Memorial Cup Playoff Semi-Finals
Flin Flon Bombers defeated Humboldt–Melfort Indians 4 games to 1
Flin Flon Bombers defeated Prince Albert Mintos 3 games to 2 (2 ties) WON SJHL CHAMPIONSHIP
Regina Pats defeated Flin Flon Bombers 4 games to 3 in the Western Canada Memorial Cup Playoffs
1957 Won SJHL Championship, Won Abbott Cup, Won Memorial Cup
Flin Flon Bombers defeated Humboldt–Melfort Indians 4 games to 0
Flin Flon Bombers defeated Prince Albert Mintos 4 games to 2 SJHL CHAMPIONSHIP WINNERS
Flin Flon Bombers defeated Edmonton Oil Kings 4 games to 2 in the Western Canada Memorial Cup Playoff Semi-Final
Flin Flon Bombers defeated Fort William Canadiens 4 games to 0 WON ABBOTT CUP
Flin Flon Bombers defeated Ottawa-Hull Canadiens 4 games to 3 WON MEMORIAL CUP
1958 Won Semi-Final, Lost Final
Flin Flon Bombers defeated Prince Albert Mintos 3 games to 1 (2 ties)
Regina Pats defeated Flin Flon Bombers 4 games to 2
1959 Won SJHL championship, lost Western Canada Memorial Cup Playoff Final
Flin Flon Bombers defeated Saskatoon Quakers 4 games to 1
Flin Flon Bombers defeated Estevan Bruins 4 games to 2 WON SJHL CHAMPIONSHIP
Flin Flon Bombers defeated Edmonton Oil Kings 4 games to 0 in the Western Canada Memorial Cup Playoff Semi-Finals
Winnipeg Braves defeated Flin Flon Bombers 4 games to 2 in the Western Canada Memorial Cup Playoff Final
1960 Won SJHL Championship, Lost Western Canada Memorial Cup Playoff Semi-Finals
Flin Flon Bombers defeated Saskatoon Quakers 4 games to 2 (1 tie)
Flin Flon Bombers defeated Regina Pats 4 games to 1 (1 tie) WON SJHL CHAMPIONSHIP
Edmonton Oil Kings defeated Flin Flon Bombers 4 games to 2 in the Western Canada Memorial Cup Semi-Finals
1961 Did Not Qualify
1962 Eliminated in the Semi-Final Round Robin
Flin Flon Bombers placed 5th place of 6, 2W–8L–0T
1963 Did Not Qualify
1964 Lost in Quarter-Finals
Saskatoon Blades defeated Flin Flon Bombers 4 games to 3
1965 Lost in Quarter-Finals
Weyburn Red Wings defeated Flin Flon Bombers 4 games to 1
1966 Did Not Qualify
MJHL (Manitoba Junior Hockey League), 1967
1967 Won MJHL Championship (Turnbull Cup)
Flin Flon Bombers defeated Winnipeg Monarchs 3 games to 0
Flin Flon Bombers defeated Brandon Wheat Kings 3 games to 2 WON TURNBULL CUP
Port Arthur Marrs (TBJHL) defeated Flin Flon Bombers 4 games to 2 in Western Memorial Cup
WCJHL (Western Canada Junior Hockey League), 1968
1968 Won Quarter-Final, Won Semi-Final, Lost Final
Flin Flon Bombers defeated Regina Pats 4 games to 0
Flin Flon Bombers defeated Edmonton Oil Kings 4 games to 1 (1 tie)
Estevan Bruins defeated Flin Flon Bombers 4 games to 0 (1 tie)
WCHL (Western Canada Hockey League), 1969–1978
1969 Won WCHL Championship, won James Piggott National Championship
Flin Flon Bombers defeated Winnipeg Jets 4 games to 2 (1 tie)
Flin Flon Bombers defeated Estevan Bruins 4 games to 0 (1 tie)
Flin Flon Bombers defeated Edmonton Oil Kings 4 games to 2 WON WCHL CHAMPIONSHIP
Flin Flon Bombers defeated St. Thomas Barons 2 games to 1† WON JAMES PIGGOTT NATIONAL CHAMPIONSHIP
 †Series forfeited by St. Thomas while down two games to one, and losing 4–0 at 10:10 of the second period of the fourth game
1970 Won WCHL Championship
Flin Flon Bombers defeated Brandon Wheat Kings 5 games to 0
Flin Flon Bombers defeated Winnipeg Jets 5 games to 4
Flin Flon Bombers defeated Edmonton Oil Kings 4 games to 0 WON WCHL CHAMPIONSHIP
1971 Won Quarter-Final, Won Semi-Final, Lost Final
Flin Flon Bombers defeated Regina Pats 4 games to 1 (1 tie)
Flin Flon Bombers defeated Winnipeg 5 games to 2
Edmonton Oil Kings defeated Flin Flon Bombers 4 games to 1 (1 tie)
1972 Lost Quarter-Finals
Regina Pats defeated Flin Flon Bombers 3 games to 2 (2 ties)
1973 Won Quarter-Finals, Lost Semi-Finals
Flin Flon Bombers defeated Regina Pats 4 games to 0
Saskatoon Blades defeated Flin Flon Bombers 4 games to 1
1974 Lost Quarter-Finals
Swift Current Broncos defeated Flin Flon Bombers 4 games to 3
1975 Did Not Qualify
1976 Did Not Qualify
1977 Did Not Qualify
1978 Advanced in Division Semi-Final Round Robin, Advanced in Division Final Round Robin, Eliminated in League Semi-Final Round Robin
Flin Flon Bombers advanced in Division Round Robin to Semi-Final Round Robin (4W–4L)
Flin Flon Bombers defeated Regina Pats 4 games to 1
Flin Flon Bombers eliminated in Semi-Final Round Robin (0W–4L)
NJHL (NorMan Junior Hockey League), 1979–1984
1979 Won NJHL championship, lost Baldy Northcott Trophy
Final: Flin Flon Bombers defeated Thompson Nickel Knights WON NJHL CHAMPIONSHIP
Baldy Northcott Trophy: Transcona Railers (MJBHL) defeated Flin Flon Bombers
1980 Won Semi-Final, Lost Final
Semi-Final: Flin Flon Bombers defeated The Pas Lumber Kings 3 games to 0
Final: Thompson King Miners defeated Flin Flon Bombers 3 games to 1
1981 Won Semi-Final, Lost Final
Semi-Final: Flin Flon Bombers defeated The Pas Lumber Kings
Final: Thompson King Miners defeated Flin Flon Bombers 4 games to 2
1982 Won NJHL Championship, lost Turnbull Cup
Final: Flin Flon Bombers defeated Thompson King Miners 4 games to 0 WON NJHL CHAMPIONSHIP
Turnbull Cup: Winnipeg South Blues (MJHL) defeated Flin Flon Bombers 3 games to 0
1983 Lost Final
Final: The Pas Huskies defeated Flin Flon Bombers
1984 Won NJHL Championship, lost Turnbull Cup
Final: Flin Flon Bombers defeated Thompson King Miners 4 games to 2 WON NJHL CHAMPIONSHIP
Turnbull Cup: Selkirk Steelers (MJHL) defeated Flin Flon Bombers 4 games to 1
SJHL (Saskatchewan Junior Hockey League, 1985–Present
1985 Lost Quarter-Final
Quarter-Final: Weyburn Red Wings defeated Creighton Bombers 4 games to 0
1986 Did Not Qualify
1987 Did Not Qualify
1988 Lost Quarter-Final
Quarter-Final: Nipawin Hawks defeated Flin Flon Bombers 4 games to 0
1989 Lost Quarter-Final
Quarter-Final: Yorkton Terriers defeated Flin Flon Bombers 4 games to 0
1990 Lost Quarter-Final
Quarter-Final: Nipawin Hawks defeated Flin Flon Bombers 4 games to 0
1991 Did Not Qualify
1992 Lost Quarter-Final
Quarter-Final: Humboldt Broncos defeated Flin Flon Bombers 4 games to 1
1993 Won SJHL Championship (Hanbidge Cup), won Anavet Cup, eliminated in Centennial Cup Round Robin
Quarter-Final: Flin Flon Bombers defeated Humboldt Broncos 4 games to 1
Semi-Final: Flin Flon Bombers defeated Nipawin Hawks 4 games to 1
Final: Flin Flon Bombers defeated Melville Millionaires 4 games to 3 WON HANBIDGE CUP (SJHL)
Anavet Cup: Flin Flon Bombers defeated Dauphin Kings (BCHL) 4 games to 2 WON ANAVET CUP (SJHL/MJHL)
Centennial Cup Round Robin: Flin Flon Bombers placed fifth in 1993 Centennial Cup Round Robin (0W–4L)
1994 Lost Preliminary Round
Preliminary Round: Nipawin Hawks defeated Flin Flon Bombers 2 games to 0
1995 Did Not Qualify
1996 Lost Preliminary Round
Preliminary Round: Humboldt Broncos defeated Flin Flon Bombers 2 games to 0
1997 Did Not Qualify
1998 Did Not Qualify
1999 Lost Preliminary Round
Preliminary Round: Battlefords North Stars defeated Flin Flon Bombers 2 games to 0
2000 Lost Quarter-Final
Quarter-Final: Humboldt Broncos defeated Flin Flon Bombers 4 games to 0
2001 Lost SJHL Semi-Final, Hosted 2001 Royal Bank Cup, Won RBC Semi-Final, Lost RBC Final
Quarter-Final: Flin Flon Bombers defeated Humboldt Broncos 4 games to 1
Semi-Final: Nipawin Hawks defeated Flin Flon Bombers 4 games to 1
RBC Cup Round Robin: Third in 2001 Royal Bank Cup Round Robin (2–2)
RBC Cup Semi-Final: Flin Flon Bombers defeated Weyburn Red Wings 4–0 in Semi-Final
RBC Final: Camrose Kodiaks (AJHL) defeated Flin Flon Bombers 5–0 in Final
2002 Did Not Qualify
2003 Did Not Qualify
2004 Did Not Qualify
2005 Did Not Qualify
2006 Won Quarter-Final, Lost Semi-Final
Quarter-Final: Flin Flon Bombers defeated Melfort Mustangs 4 games to 3
Semi-Final: Battlefords North Stars defeated Flin Flon Bombers 4 games to 1
2007 Did Not Qualify
2008 Won Quarter-Final, Lost Semi-Final
Quarter-Final: Flin Flon Bombers defeated Melfort Mustangs 4 games to 2
Semi-Final: Humboldt Broncos defeated Flin Flon Bombers 4 games to 0
2009 Won Quarter-Final, Lost Semi-Final
Quarter-Final: Flin Flon Bombers defeated Melfort Mustangs 4 games to 0
Semi-Final: Humboldt Broncos defeated Flin Flon Bombers 4 games to 0
2010 Lost Quarter-Final
Quarter-Final: La Ronge Ice Wolves defeated Flin Flon Bombers 4 games to 2
2011 Won Survivor Series, Lost Quarter-Final
Survivor Series: Flin Flon Bombers defeated Battlefords North Stars 3 games to 1
Quarter-Final: La Ronge Ice Wolves defeated Flin Flon Bombers 4 games to 1
2012 Lost Survivor Series
Survivor Series: La Ronge Ice Wolves defeated Flin Flon Bombers 3 games to 0
2013 Won Quarter-Final, Lost Semi-Final
Quarter-Final: Flin Flon Bombers defeated Nipawin Hawks 4 games to 2
Semi-Final: Humboldt Broncos defeated Flin Flon Bombers 4 games to 1
2014 Lost Wildcard Series
Wildcard Series: Estevan Bruins defeated Flin Flon Bombers 3 games to 2
2015 Lost Quarter-Final Series
Quarter-Final: Notre Dame Hounds defeated Flin Flon Bombers 4 games to 3
2016 Won Quarter-Final, Won Semi-Final, Lost Final
Quarter-Final: Flin Flon Bombers defeated Weyburn Red Wings 4 games to 1
Semi-Final: Flin Flon Bombers defeated Battlefords North Stars 4 games to 1
Final: Melfort Mustangs defeated Flin Flon Bombers 4 games to 2
2017 Won Quarter-Final, Won Semi-Final, Lost Final
Quarter-Final: Flin Flon Bombers defeated Notre Dame Hounds 4 games to 1
Semi-Final: Flin Flon Bombers defeated Nipawin Hawks 4 games to 3
Final: Battlefords North Stars defeated Flin Flon Bombers 4 games to 0
2018 Won Wildcard Series, Lost Quarter-Final
Wildcard Series: Flin Flon Bombers defeated Notre Dame Hounds 2 games to 1
Quarter-Final: Nipawin Hawks defeated Flin Flon Bombers 4 games to 1
2019 Won Wildcard Series, Lost Quarter-Final
Wildcard Series: Flin Flon Bombers defeated Weyburn Red Wings 2 games to 0
Quarter-Final: Battlefords North Stars defeated Flin Flon Bombers 4 games to 3
2020 Won Quarter-Final
Quarter-Final: Flin Flon Bombers defeated Humboldt Broncos 4 games to 0
Playoffs cancelled due to COVID-19 pandemic
2021 Season cancelled due to COVID-19 pandemic
2022 Won Quarter-Final, Won Semi-Final
Quarter-Final: Flin Flon Bombers defeated Battlefords North Stars 4 games to 2
Semi-Final: Flin Flon Bombers defeated Humboldt Broncos 4 games to 1
Final: Estevan Bruins defeated Flin Flon Bombers 4 games to 3
2022 Centennial Cup Round Robin: Flin Flon Bombers advanced to playoff round
2022 Centennial Cup Playoffs:Pickering Panthers defeated Flin Flon Bombers 3 to 2 in 2OT, eliminated

Player awards

Scoring champions

Goaltender of the Year

Defenceman of the Year

Rookie of the Year

Most Valuable Player

Player of the Year

Coach of the Year

See also
 List of ice hockey teams in Manitoba
 List of ice hockey teams in Saskatchewan

References

External links
 Flin Flon Bombers official site
1956–57 Flin Flon Bombers at Manitoba Sports Hall of Fame
1956–57 Flin Flon Bombers at Manitoba Hockey Hall of Fame
Saskatchewan Junior Hockey League

Former Western Hockey League teams
Saskatchewan Junior Hockey League teams
Manitoba Junior Hockey League teams
1927 establishments in Manitoba
Sport in Flin Flon
Ice hockey clubs established in 1927